Rise to the Occasion is reggae, dancehall artist Sizzla's eighteenth studio album. The album was released on September 30, 2003. The album is a mix of dancehall and reggae, with singles such as "Rise to the Occasion" and "Give Me a Try".

Track listing
"Rise to the Occasion" - 3:53
"All Is Well"  - 3:34
"Give Me a Try"- 3:40
"Give Praises" - 3:19
"The One" - 3:30
"Don't Trouble Us" - 3:27
"I Was Born" - 2:38
"It's Burning" - 3:29
"Nice & Lovely" - 3:55
"Know Yourself" - 3:40
"In the Mood" - 3:37
"Come On" - 3:26
"These Are the Days" - 3:31
"Fire Blaze" - 3:49
"Hype" - 3:41
"True Love" - 3:34
"All I Need" - 3:23

References

Sizzla albums
2003 albums